Nicholas Boraine (born 14 November 1971) is a South African actor.

Life and education
Boraine graduated from the University of Witwatersrand in 1994 with an Honours Degree in Dramatic Art. In March 2011, he joined Global Arts Corps as Associate Artistic Director. His father, Alex Boraine, is a former South African politician and former Deputy Chairperson of South Africa's Truth and Reconciliation Commission (TRC).

Filmography

Film

Inside (1996)
Sweepers (1998) - Mitch
I Dreamed of Africa (2000) - Duncan Maitland
Operation Delta Force 5: Random Fire (2000) - Gary
Witness to a Kill (2001) - Karl Wolf
Slash (2002) - Billy Bob
Promised Land (2002) - George Neethling
Glory Glory (2002) - Frank
Dead End
In My Country (2004) - Jack Marlon
Critical Assignment (2004) - William Le Trois
Berserker (2004) - Clifford
Cape of Good Hope (2004) - Stephen van Heern
The Breed (2006) - Luke
District 9 (2009) - Craig Weldon
Jozi (2010) - Carl
The Bang Bang Club (2010) - Colin
Paradise Stop (2011) - John Sylvester
The Salvation (2014) - Man With Cigar
Assignment (2015) - Boris the Merciful
Grimsby (2016) - Joris Smit
Detour (2016) - Lecturer
Money Monster (2016) - British Reporter
Mandela's Gun (2016) - Cecil Williams
Running for Grace (2018) - Danielson
Bloodline (2018) - Lou
Know Your Enemy (2019) - Steve

Television
Hillside
Crossroads (2006, TV Movie, SAFTA Award Best Supporting Actor) - Jimmy Black
The Mating Game (2010) - Warren
Binnelanders (2010) - Oliver Knight
Homeland (2014) - Alan Hensleigh
Black Sails (2015) - Peter Ashe
Chicago Fire (2017) - Dennis Mack
Designated Survivor (2019) - Wouter Momberg
For All Mankind (2022) - Lars Hagstrom

Video games
Call of Duty: Black Ops 4 (2018) - Stanton Shaw
Call of Duty: Modern Warfare (2019) - Norris

Theatre
Birdy - Vita Award Best Actor
Popcorn - Vita Award Best Actor
The Rocky Horror Show - Vita Award Best Musical Actor
Shopping and F*cking - Vita Award Best Supporting Actor
SIC
Truth in Translation
Faustus 
Metamorphosis

References

External links

1971 births
Living people
White South African people
South African male film actors
South African male television actors
Place of birth missing (living people)
South African male stage actors
University of the Witwatersrand alumni